Kenneth Maryboy (born May 13, 1961) is an American politician for San Juan County, Utah, and was Navajo Nation Council Delegate. Kenneth is a former San Juan County Commissioner.  Maryboy was the third Democrat in a row to have been elected to the Commissioner District 3 position since its inception in 1984 that divided the county into three districts. Kenneth was replaced on the commission in 2015 by Rebecca M. Benally

Kenneth Maryboy is the brother of Mark Maryboy who served the Navajo Nation Council Delegates for 16 years and also served as the San Juan County Commissioner for four terms. Kenneth also shares the same Navajo Nation council representation as Davis Filfred, in the Utah Section of the reservation.

He also works alongside Rebecca M. Benally and the San Juan School Board for the Utah Navajo student curriculum, and Bruce Adams for the San Juan County affairs.

Maryboy was once again reelected during the 2010 National Midterm/Navajo Nation Elections in the positions of San Juan County Commissioner District Three and as a Council Delegate in the newly reduced 24 member Navajo Nation Tribal Council respectively.

Early life 
At age 18, he was living with his mother and younger brother on the reservation near Bluff, Utah. They were barely making ends meet on his meager wages as a welder. Although times were rather harsh, Kenneth managed to improve his skills at Welding, as time progressed he learned to Electrician's trade and from there advanced to other markets which were in demand of his skills

Later in life Maryboy, known as a "Medicine Man" among people living on land encompassing the Four-Corners Region of the United States, ministers to the physical, mental and spiritual needs of his people. Maryboy bridges the gap between the old ways of the Navajo, and the current life in America.

He also was routinely desired for a natural another talent, which was an Announcer. During Rodeo seasons he would be asked to announce for many different events and venues.

KTNN radio announcer 
In April 1993, KTNN 660 AM, a Navajo Language AM radio station, broadcasting from Window Rock, Arizona, began commentaries for the NBA team, the Phoenix Suns.

Kenneth Maryboy, a rodeo announcer, along with the KTNN Sports Director, L.A. Williams did the play-by-play for their first Suns game. This was a first amongst Navajo Broadcasting stations to be affiliated with a Major League Basketball team.

Navajo Santa
Invoking his own happy childhood memories of the celebration of Christmas at St. Christopher's Mission, Maryboy created a program, the Navajo Santa, to help serve his people with the spirit of Christmas all year long. He adapted the concept of Santa Claus to meet the needs of the Native Americans who are among the most impoverished people in the U.S. The program provides gifts of food, clothing, blankets, and toys, medical care, and other services. He provides hope for everyone served by his joyful program. 

"I would like to see that the understanding and the caring will continue on—that people will understand togetherness and what caring means to other people I still envision a lot more things that I might be able to do, not only in the Navajo Nation but maybe in a broader area as well where there is need."

A non-profit organization, Navajo Santa was created to bring food, blankets, warm clothing, toys, and other necessities to Navajos in need on the reservation in southeastern Utah. Entirely volunteer supported, Navajo Santa provides an exchange of culture and support between Navajos and non-Navajos.

Kenneth is now 49 and commissioner for San Juan County. His solo Christmas Eve visits have grown into an annual Navajo feast with gifts of clothing, tools and toys for over 700 people. Kids who can't make it to the event because they're sick or lack transportation get a personal visit from Kenneth or one of his elves.

"My grandfather taught me that you learn to be a man and a warrior by sharing and by keeping promises," he says.

Caring Institute Award

On November 18, 2002,  Kenneth went to Washington, D.C., to receive the Caring Institute Award, an honor previously given to Mother Teresa, President Jimmy Carter and Rosalynn Carter, and this year to Paul Newman. Other winners include former Senator Bob Dole and Reverend Billy Graham.

Navajo Nation Council Delegate 

In 2000, Maryboy was elected into the legislative body of Navajo Nation Government as a Navajo Nation Council Delegate for the Mexican Water, Aneth and Red Mesa Chapters. These areas expand the Arizonan and Utahn borders with a constituency of nearly 10,000 people.

Upon election, Kenneth positioned himself in the Navajo Economic Development committee where he serves as the Vice Chair for the Navajo Nation Nation Council.

Navajo Nation Council reduction
On Dec. 15, 2009, Tribal members voted to reduce the Navajo Tribal Council from 88 to 24 members, and the Navajo Nation Supreme Court ordered immediate implementation of the redistricting in a May 28, 2010 decision. With this Navajo Nation-wide action, it resulting in pitting Councilman Maryboy against fellow Councilman, Davis Filfred during the November 2, 2010 General Elections.

Councilman Maryboy defeated Councilman Filfred for a newly redistricted "Shiprock Agency" section on the Navajo Reservation.

2010 Navajo Election results
Kenneth Maryboy WINNER

Total Votes by Chapter - 1,114

039 - Aneth Chapter           251

028 - Mexican Water Chapter   173

099 - Red Mesa Chapter        280

031 - TeecNosPos Chapter      230

030 - Sweet Water Chapter     180

Davis Filfred

Total Votes by Chapter - 1,053

039 - Aneth Chapter         347

028 - Mexican Water Chapter 149

099 - Red Mesa Chapter      261

031 - TeecNosPos Chapter    116

030 - Sweet Water Chapter   180

(Write-in) "Francis Redhouse"

Total Votes by Chapter - 593

039 - Aneth Chapter         151

028 - Mexican Water Chapter  33

099 - Red Mesa Chapter       84

031 - TeecNosPos Chapter    222

030 - Sweet Water Chapter   103

2010 Investigation into Navajo Nation Lawmakers Discretionary Funds

In October 2010, Navajo tribal officials, were charged in an investigation of slush funds just weeks before the November election. Not Guilty was what was pleaded for the Councilmen charged for fraud, conspiracy and theft.

Washington D.C.-based  Special prosecutor Alan Balaran reported results on the investigation in which he filed criminal complaints against current Vice President/President-Elect, Ben Shelly, and at least 77 members of the 88-delegate Council as part of a sweeping investigation into the use of discretionary funds that Davis Filfred and Maryboy were named in as well.

2014 Navajo Presidential Campaign
Kenneth Maryboy was one of Seventeen Candidates Campaigning for Navajo Nation President, He lost the Primary against Chris Deschnee and Joe Shirley JR., placing fifth with 3,738 Votes.

San Juan County Commissioner 
 
 
In November 2006, Kenneth Maryboy was elected as the San Juan County Commissionership for District 3. The commissionership delegates handle county issues in Monticello, Utah. The San Juan County Commissioner seat is a three person council which oversee's the needs and issues for San Juan County's residents.

Commissioner Maryboy won a bid to the Commissionership nomination after an extensive primary battle between himself and Andrew Tso of Montezuma Creek, Utah during the 2010 San Juan County Primaries.

2010 Primary Election results
San Juan County, Utah

County Commission Dist #3

Kenneth Maryboy DEM
 
Bluff
85

Montezuma Creek
97

Aneth
69

Mexican Hat
47

Red Mesa
43

Early Voting
1

Canvass
6

TOTAL
348

Andrew Tso      DEM

Bluff
21

Montezuma Creek
45

Aneth
77

Mexican Hat
3

Red Mesa
23

Early Voting 
4

Canvass
4

TOTAL
177

San Juan County 2010 General Election
After successfully defeating Andrew Tso, Maryboy went on to be reelected to his particular county office, unopposed, in the 2010 San Juan County General election.

Commissionership issues

Conflicting dual-elected positions issues 
After being elected as the San Juan County Commissioner and as the Navajo Nation Council Delegate, questions arose as to the Legitimacy and the Ethical position as an elected official of both seats. Members elected to maintain service to two governments bodies was a hot button issue; Kenneth Maryboy fell exactly in this position which was the subject of concern.

Following the October 16, 2007 Navajo Nation Council vote, granting delegates to maintain service as Councilmen & County Representatives, Maryboy to was allowed to maintain his positions as both the San Juan County Commissioner and Navajo Nation Council Delegate for the Aneth, Red Mesa, and Mexican Water Chapters

The Navajo voice of San Juan
Kenneth Maryboy has to balance his role as a Navajo leader with duties as a San Juan County commissioner, taking office in January. His brother, Mark Maryboy, made history when he was elected in 1986 as the first American Indian county commissioner, also in San Juan, in Utah's history. The county has had one Navajo county commissioner ever since.

"More than 55 percent of registered voters in San Juan County are Native Americans, and they need to be represented, which is something that maybe Anglo commissioners had not had that perspective before." - Bruce Adams (San Juan Commissioner Dist. 1)

Utah Navajo issues 

Historically, Utah Navajos were ignored not only by the county and state governments but also by the Navajo Nation.

Located in the Four-Corners regions of the United States, the narrow Utah strip that is home to 8,000 of the Navajo Nation's 300,000 citizens. San Juan County officials long believed Utah Navajos were primarily the responsibility of the tribe. The Council, on the other hand, held that their Utah kin could fend for themselves after a 1933 federal mandate awarded them 37.5 percent of royalties from the rich oil fields near Aneth on Utah's portion of the reservation.

Utah Navajo Trust Fund

But between 1933 and 1990, the Utah Navajo Oil Trust Fund was plundered of $150 million, according to a Utah legislative auditor's report. The Navajos' lawsuit against the state is still pending. The State of Utah is the only state in the Nation administering a trust fund for the benefit of American Indians whose lands are within state boundaries. The Utah Navajos have sought to have a more active role in the distribution of the royalties and this would present that opportunity. Legislative leadership has committed to provide a way to make the transition process as seamless as possible for the beneficiaries.

Trust Fund to Sunset

Currently since, Utah's Navajo Trust Fund statute is set to sunset in 2008. Utah Governor Jon Huntsman and Legislative Leadership in 2007 have joined together in asking Congress to create a new disbursement system for the royalties. The Utah Legislative leadership are now actively working with the Utah Navajo Element in regards to controlling of these royalties. 

Utah Senate Minority Leader Mike Dmitrich saying Our congressional delegation must create a vehicle to distribute these monies in a way that all of the Chapter Houses have input.

Kenneth Maryboy and Davis Filfred have been active in the Utah Navajo Trust fund as well as helping the transition between Utah's Primary role in control the Utah Navajo Trust to the Utah Navajos themselves.

Lack of Navajo Nation infrastructure on Utah Navajo land 
According to Kenneth's he feels his position and mission for his constituents are to help bring basic services to the people in his district. In fact, the Navajo Nation services which are not on the Utah side of the reservation include:

• Navajo Division of Public Safety Locations: 30 in Arizona, 13 in New Mexico

• Emergency Medical Services: 9 in Arizona, 4 in New Mexico

• Fire and Rescue Services: 6 in Arizona

• Criminal Investigation Section: 5 in Arizona, 2 in New Mexico

• Corrections: 4 in Arizona, 3 in New Mexico

• Victim Assistance: 2 in Arizona, 2 in New Mexico

• Police Districts: 4 in Arizona, 2 in New Mexico

• Office of Chief Prosecutors: 3 in Arizona, 4 in New Mexico

No Navajo Nation Health, Education and Welfare offices are in Utah:
• Division of Health: 22 in Arizona, 11 in New Mexico

• Navajo Area Agency on Aging: 4 in Arizona, 2 in New Mexico

• Behavioral Health Services: 4 in Arizona, 2 in New Mexico

• Communicable Disease Program: 5 in Arizona, 2 in New Mexico

• Food Distribution Program: 5 in Arizona, 3 in New Mexico

• WIC Program: 4 in Arizona, 2 in New Mexico

• Division of Dine Education: 17 in Arizona, 8 in New Mexico

• Office of Dine Youth: 4 in Arizona, 2 in New Mexico,

• Dept. of Head Start: 4 in Arizona, 2 in New Mexico

• Office of Special Education/Rehabilitation: 5 in Arizona, 2 in New Mexico

• Office of Scholarship/Financial Assistance: 4 in Arizona, 2 in New Mexico

• Division of Social Services: 12 in Arizona, 9 in New Mexico

• Regional Offices: 5 in Arizona, 3 in New Mexico

• Sub Offices: 7 in Arizona, 6 in New Mexico

Utah Navajo oil revenues
Recently Counsel Delegates Kenneth Maryboy, Davis Filfred, and Former Counsel Delegate Mark Maryboy have been actively working to ensure that the Aneth Oil Royalties stay with the Utah Navajo people.

However such causes are not without competition, the Navajo Nation itself has been working counter to the Utah Navajo people in taking over the Aneth Oil Revenues. It presents a significant problem with a line of issues Kenneth is up against.

On June 16, 2008, Kenneth Maryboy, Mark Maryboy, Davis Filfred, and the honorable Phil Lyman of Blanding, Utah will travel to Washington, D.C. to present a working model of how an easy transition from the State of Utah handling Utah Navajo royalty money, to a functioning Utah Navajo organization before Congress.

Also, December 8, 2009, The U.S. Senate Indian Affairs Committee conducted two hearings that Wednesday morning. The back-to-back hearings which took place in Room 628 Dirksen Senate Office Building, in Washington, D.C.

Senate Bill 1690 

The first hearing was on Senate Bill 1690 , which would transfer trustee authority and resources for the Utah Navajo Trust Fund from the state of Utah to the Utah Dineh Corporation Inc. The second hearing is an oversight hearing to examine the chronic backlog of Indian land transaction decisions at the Interior Department. The backlog effectively blocks many tribes from using their lands, often for years, until those decisions are made. 

Locally, the biggest issue is an emotional tussle over a trust fund that holds royalties from oil and gas leases in and around Aneth. That fund's assets doubled to more than $52 million this year when Utah agreed to settle a lawsuit over alleged abuses during the decades that the state oversaw it.

Utah gave up its oversight role two years ago, and no projects to benefit the Utah Navajos — many of whom have no electricity or running water — can be initiated until Congress picks a new trustee. The Navajo Nation, which receives 62.5 percent of the royalties, wants control of the whole fund.

"Hell no," says Kenneth Maryboy, one of the council candidates and a San Juan County commissioner. "Keep the money in Utah."
Oil fund at center of Utah Navajo Nation Council election

Navajo relationship with the State of Utah 

On Jan. 27, 2009, a Navajo delegation attended Indian Caucus Day. Utah Navajo Delegates Maryboy and Davis Filfred attended the Indian Caucus Day at the Utah State Capitol to advocate on behalf of Navajo constituents living in the state of Utah.

Elected leaders from the Utah's five tribes met with former Utah State Gov. Jon M. Huntsman Jr., Gov. Gary R. Herbert, Attorney General Mark Shurtleff and a number of program directors to emphasize the importance of maintaining adequate funding for programs which provide direct services to tribal citizens.

Thestate of Utah announced major budgetary problems for the upcoming fiscal year and has proposed possible cuts of 15 percent for state agencies. At the caucus, tribal leaders urged Utah state leaders to recognize the limitation in state services currently available to Utah tribes and asked for specific programs to be maintained, despite the economic challenges faced by the state.

Kenneth Maryboy went on to state, "With proposed budgetary cuts, it is important as tribal leaders that we are clear about what state programs we believe are most important to retain. It is also pertinent we are clear about what our goals are in terms of strengthening state and tribal relations."

Life away from politics 
Currently, although politics does take up much of Kenneth's time, he has found hobbies and activities to help balance out the fast pace public service life. With his family collectively joining him, Kenneth spends time with ATVs and hunting as a side passion. The Maryboy family is quite closely involved with many outdoor racing venues such as mudbogging and drag racing. In fact the Maryboy family runs a racing club called Whiterock Racing.

As with most Western Democrats, Kenneth enjoys a sustaintial amount of time utilizing his time with taking advantage of the immensely rural southwestern environment with such activities like hunting and fishing. The southern Utah area is filled with a variety of outdoor activities for most people who reside in the area and Kenneth maintains that tradition as most Utans do.

Many southern Utahns enjoy the offers that Lake Powell has to provide. Kenneth and his family enjoy the many opportunities that the lake does provide that many other Utahns and Southwestern Americans take advantage of as well.

References

External links
Official sites
(Official)
Kenneth Maryboy Twitter
Kenneth Maryboy Myspace
San Juan County Website
Navajo Santa Website
Navajo Santa Facebook

Documentaries, topic pages and databases
Utah to Allow Sunset of Navajo Trust Fund
Nativebiz: Indian Owned
"The Christmas Warrior"
"Our Campaigns - Candidate - Kenneth Maryboy"
"Indians finding a voice in San Juan"
Utah Democratic Party
Salt Lake Tribune Public Lands director's departure pleases environmentalists, some Navajos
Aneth Oil Field
"Navajos say Utah cheated their tribe"
KTNN 660 AM
Kennedy meets with tribal leaders to promote Kerry
"COUNCIL DELEGATES MEET WITH SENATOR TED KENNEDY"

Living people
1961 births
Members of the Navajo Nation Council
County commissioners in Utah
People from San Juan County, Utah
Utah Democrats
20th-century Native American politicians
21st-century Native American politicians
Native American people from Utah